In sports, a line call occurs when there is doubt as to whether a specific and significant event took place, for example, whether the ball in tennis touched the line rather than landing outside the court.

The phrase line call is more generally used to indicate any decision in which the correct course is uncertain.

The official rules of most sports indicate how line calls are to be resolved. The actual phrase line call may or may not appear in the official rules.

Cricket
In cricket, uncertainty is generally resolved in the manner most favourable to the batsman. Thus,  if the umpires are not sure whether a dismissal actually occurred, the batsman is deemed not out. Similarly, if the umpires are unsure as to whether the bowler's action was legal for a particular delivery, a no-ball is called.

Sports terminology